Åsa Elisabeth Romson (born 22 March 1972) is a Swedish politician who was the Minister for the Environment and ceremonial Deputy Prime Minister of Sweden in the Swedish Government from 2014 to 2016. She is a member of the Green Party and served as one of its spokespersons along with Gustav Fridolin between 2011 and 2016.

In 2012, Romson completed a doctorate in environmental law at Stockholm University.

Political career 
In the late 1990s, she was a member of the Green Party and the Young Greens of Sweden. Between 2002 and 2010, she was a member of the city council in Stockholm. Since the 2010 election she has been a spokesperson for environmental and climate policy. She has been a member of the Swedish parliament since the 2010 election.

On 29 March 2011, she was nominated as one of the candidates to be the Green Party's new spokesperson, together with Gustav Fridolin. They were elected on 21 May 2011.

She started serving as the Minister for the Environment and Deputy Prime Minister of Sweden in the Löfven Cabinet. Romson announced her intention in May 2016 to resign from the Government, following the Green Party's decision not to nominate her for the party leadership for another term.

Controversies
In October 2014, Romson used an outlawed type of paint on the bottom of the boat she lives on. She claimed ignorance on both counts.

On 19 April 2016, she described the September 11 attacks on the World Trade Center as "olycka" (meaning "accident", "disaster" or "misfortune" depending on context). She explained that the disaster she was referring  to in that context (the Swedish word "olycka" can mean accident or disaster) was that the topic of integration had become inflamed as a result of the attack.

References

External links
 Åsa Romson's blog
 Åsa Romson at the Green Party

|-

 Alongside:  Gustav Fridolin

|-

|-

Serving with:  Margot Wallström 

|-

|-

|-

1972 births
Living people
Members of the Riksdag from the Green Party
Swedish Ministers for the Environment
Deputy Prime Ministers of Sweden
21st-century Swedish women politicians
Women government ministers of Sweden
Women members of the Riksdag